Rursiceras is a Jurassic ammonite belonging to the ammonitid.

Distribution
France and Switzerland

References
Notes

Jurassic ammonites
Ammonitida genera
Aspidoceratidae